Charm & Strange is a young adult mystery novel with paranormal elements by Stephanie Kuehn, published June 11, 2013 by St. Martin's Griffin.

Reception 
Charm & Strange received positive reviews from Booklist, Publishers Weekly, The Horn Book, The Bulletin of the Center for Children's Books, and School Library Journal, as well as a mediocre review from Kirkus.

 YALSA's Popular Paperbacks for Young Adults Top Ten (2016)
 William C. Morris YA Debut Award (2014)
 Carnegie Medal Nominee (2014)
 California Book Award finalist (2014)

References 

2013 American novels
American young adult novels
St. Martin's Press books